The Butte Fire was a rapidly moving wildfire during the 2015 California wildfire season that started on September 9 in Amador County, California. The fire burned .

Officials stated that the fire was expanding in all directions and that efforts were being hampered by difficult topography.

Officials from the Amador County Unified School District chose to close all schools in the district on Friday as well. Later that day, as the fire continued to grow, Governor Jerry Brown declared a state of emergency in Amador and Calaveras counties.

On September 16, the Calaveras County coroner announced that the bodies of two people had been found in the Mokelumne Hill and Mountain Ranch areas.

Wildfire victim claims 

On June 22, 2017, Sacramento Judge Allen Sumner ruled that because "...the Butte Fire was caused by a public improvement as deliberately designed and constructed by Pacific Gas and Electric Company," the company is liable for all property damages caused by the fire.

On July 1, 2020, the PG&E Fire Victim Trust (FVT) was established as part of the reorganization plan of the 2019 bankruptcy of PG&E to administer the claims of the wildfire victims. Also on July 1, PG&E funded the Fire Victim Trust (FVT) with $5.4 billion in cash and 22.19% of stock in the reorganized PG&E, which covers most of the obligations of its settlement for the wildfire victims. PG&E has two more payments totaling $1.35 billion in cash, scheduled to be paid in January 2021 and January 2022, to complete its obligations to the wildfire victims.

References

2015 California wildfires
Wildfires in Amador County, California
Wildfires in Calaveras County, California
2015 in California
September 2015 events in the United States